In optics, wall-plug efficiency  or radiant efficiency is the energy conversion efficiency with which the system converts electrical power into optical power. It is defined as the ratio of the radiant flux (i.e., the total optical output power) to the input electrical power.

In laser systems, this efficiency includes losses in the power supply and also the power required for a cooling system, not just the laser itself.

See also 
 Luminous efficiency
 Luminous coefficient
 Luminous efficacy - Efficacy, weighted by the eye's response to light
 Coefficient of utilization

References 

Energy conversion